Finotto may refer to:

 Martino Finotto (1933-2014), Italian racing driver 
 Mattia Finotto (born 1992), Italian football player in the role of forward 
 Scuderia Finotto, an Italian motor racing team from Italy, founded by Jurg Dubler